This page includes the full discography of Yolandita Monge. Listed are all  of Monge's albums in order of their release. Additional information include chart positions.

Studio albums

Live albums

Remixed albums

Digital singles

Maxi single albums

Compilation albums

Special appearances

Music videos

Soundtracks

Singles

References

External links
Yolandita Monge's full discography
[ Yolandita Monge's partial discography at Billboard.com]

Latin pop music discographies
Discographies of American artists